, there are 14 listed Conservation Areas in the borough of Southend-on-Sea in Essex, England. Southend-on-Sea started out as a few fishermens' huts at the South End of Prittlewell, before becoming a holiday destination during the Victorian era.

In 1968 Southend Borough Council created the first conservation area in Clifftown, the home to the first Georgian and Victorian development of the town including its first park, Prittlewell Square.

Conservation areas

See also
Southend-on-Sea
List of conservation areas in England

References

 
 
Buildings and structures in Southend-on-Sea
Southend-on-Sea